The 2023 Milano Seamen season is the first season of the Milano Seamen in the European League of Football for the 2023 season, after playing in the Italian Football League the year prior.

Preseason
After the announcement of the participation in the 2023 ELF season, the head coach of the previous season in the Italy national league was hired, again. Also, the stadium of the last season, the Velodromo Vigorelli, was confirmed.

The first signing was quarterback Luke Zahradka, native born in the United States, but also being a dual-passport citizen in Italy. He is also starting quarterback of the Italy national team, winning the silver medal in Flag football at the 2022 World Games. Further notable signings were Jéan Constant and Marquise Manning, latter playing for the Washburn Ichabods football team in the NCAA Division II.

Regular season

Standings

Roster

Staff

Notes

References 

Milano Seamen seasons
Milano Seamen
Milano Seamen